Mai Kuraki Best 151A: Love & Hope is the third Greatest Hits album released by the Japanese singer Mai Kuraki. It was released on 12 November 2014 on the Northern Music label.

Background
The title of album (151A) means "15th anniversary one word thank you".

The album includes six previously released singles, from Koi no Koishite to Stand by you. It is divided into two parts: Love, which contains mix of Kuraki's ballad songs, and Hope, which contains a mix of Kuraki's dance songs.

The cover jacket of the album is the same as that of her first album Delicious Way, with the same pose, hair style and looking into the camera.

Charting performance
The album reached #2 in its first week. It charted for 15 weeks and sold 67,000 copies.

Track listing

Disc one: LOVE

Disc two: HOPE

Usage in media
"Secret of my heart" was used as an ending theme for anime Detective Conan
"Time After Time" was used as the theme song for the movie Detective Conan: Crossroad in the Ancient Capital
"Shiroi Yuki" was used as an ending theme for anime Detective Conan
"Tomorrow is the last time" was used as an ending theme for anime Detective Conan
"Koi ni Koishite" was used as an ending theme for anime Detective Conan
"Your Best Friend" was used as an ending theme for anime Detective Conan
"always" was used as an ending theme for anime Detective Conan and as the theme song for the movie Detective Conan: Countdown to Heaven
"Revive" was used as an opening theme for anime Detective Conan
"Try Again" was used as an opening theme for anime Detective Conan
"Muteki na Heart" was used as an ending theme for anime Detective Conan
"Dynamite" was used as opening theme for anime Detective Conan and as the theme song for TV special The Disappearance of Edogawa Conan
"Ashita he Kakeru Hashi" was used as an ending theme for NHK night dramas Motto Koiseyo Otome and Hikeshiya Komachi
"Aitakute" was used as the theme song for the movie Ohsaka Hamlet
"Mou Ichido" was used as the theme song for the drama Kiri ni Sumu Akuma
"Stand Up" was used as a commercial song for Coca-Cola
"Feel fine!" was used as a commercial song for Sea Breeze
"Watashi no Shiranai Watashi" was used as a commercial song for KOSE's Esprique Precious
"Strong Heart" was used as a theme song for the drama Hunter -Sono Onna Tachi, Shoukinkasegi-
"Wake me up" was used as a theme song for the live-action movie Kiki's Delivery Service

References

External links

Mai Kuraki official website

Mai Kuraki albums
2014 compilation albums
Japanese-language compilation albums
Being Inc. compilation albums
Albums produced by Daiko Nagato